John Troy (born 19 January 1971) is an Irish retired hurler who played for club side Lusmagh and at inter-county level with the Offaly senior hurling team.

Career

Born in Lusmagh, County Offaly, Troy first came to prominence as goalkeeper with the Offaly minor team that won All-Ireland Minor Championship titles in 1986, 1987 and 1989. He later won back-to-back Leinster Under-21 Championships with the under-21 team, having already joined his brother Jim Troy on the senior team. Troy collected his first silverware with the team in 1990 when Offaly won the Leinster Championship before claiming the National League title the following year. He won a second provincial title in 1994 before ending the season as an All-Ireland Championship-winner after a defeat of Limerick in the final. Troy won a third provincial title the following year before claiming a second All-Ireland winners' medal in 1998. After a defeat to Kilkenny in the 2000 All-Ireland final, Troy lined out for one further season.

Honours

Lusmagh
Offaly Senior Club Hurling Championship: 1989

Offaly
All-Ireland Senior Hurling Championship: 1994, 1998
Leinster Senior Hurling Championship: 1990, 1994, 1995
National Hurling League: 1990-91
Leinster Under-21 Hurling Championship: 1991, 1992
All-Ireland Minor Hurling Championship: 1986, 1987, 1989
Leinster Minor Hurling Championship: 1986, 1987, 1989

Awards
All-Stars: 1999

References

1971 births
Living people
Lusmagh hurlers
Offaly inter-county hurlers
All-Ireland Senior Hurling Championship winners
Hurling goalkeepers